Malika Jawahir Khatun locally known as Dadi Jawari was a 17-century female ruler of Gilgit, Pakistan. She is remembered as the first female ruler in male-dominated society in that area and for her gift of irrigation systems, including two canals for drinking water and agrarian purposes. She ruled Gilgit from 1630 till 1660.

Water channels built by Dadi Jawari consisted of two wide canals known as Ajini Daljah (upper canal) and Kherini Daljah (lower channel). The channels supplied water to agricultural lands on the outskirts what are now Barmas, Nagral, Majini Mohallah, Soni Kot and Kashrote. The channels also helped the cultivation of peripheral barren lands to form new settlements, as in earlier times the settlements were confined to Barmas, Jutial and Napoor. Dadi Juwari had to hire labor from the neighbouring Darrel valley (located in today's Diamer district) when her subjects or the citizens of the Gilgit refused to take part in the construction of the water channels.

Dadi also built roads in her dominion and undertook various welfare measures to ease the lives of her people.

References

17th-century births
Year of birth unknown
Date of death unknown
Year of death unknown
History of Gilgit-Baltistan
17th-century women rulers
18th-century women rulers